Lady Gertrude Georgina Stock (née Douglas; 21 August 1842 – 25 November 1893) was an English aristocrat and novelist, who also wrote under the pseudonym George Douglas. In 1891 she founded the National Canine Defence League (today known as Dogs Trust) to protect dogs from "torture and ill-usage of every kind".

Life
Gertrude Douglas was the daughter of John Douglas, 7th Marquess of Queensberry and his wife Sarah Sholto Douglas (died 1856). Like her mother, she converted to Roman Catholicism.

Her novels include Brown as a Berry (1874, as George Douglas). Her fiction has been described as "robust" and featuring "hoydenish heroines".

Founding of Dogs Trust
Lady Gertrude Stock brought together a "small party of gentlemen" in the "Royal Agricultural Hall" in Islington, during the first Crufts dog show. The National Canine Defence League began operations funded entirely by donations from members and supporters. The group campaigned for the protection of strays, the provision of proper veterinary care and to campaign against muzzling, prolonged chaining and experimentation on dogs, which was a common practice at the time. By 1902 membership had risen to 1,000.

References

1842 births
1893 deaths
19th-century British novelists
Pseudonymous women writers
19th-century British women writers
Daughters of British marquesses
Gertrude
Animal welfare and rights in the United Kingdom
Animal welfare workers
British Roman Catholics
Converts to Roman Catholicism
Victorian women writers
19th-century pseudonymous writers